Fantasy Pictures Entertainment is a Chinese independent film production company and distributor founded by photographer Lin Fan in 2005. Focusing primarily on independent films, Fantasy was involved in the production of Lou Ye's Summer Palace, Robin Weng's Fujian Blue, and Wang Bing's Fengming, a Chinese Memoir. The company focuses primarily on independent Chinese filmmakers.

Recently, the company under former Polybona Films producer Yuan Gadi has begun to expand into genre films, particularly science fiction.

Notes

External links 
 Fantasy Pictures from Variety

Film production companies of China
Film distributors of China
Companies based in Beijing
Entertainment companies established in 2005
2005 establishments in China